Aleksandra Vojnevska is a sprinter from North Macedonia born on 2 May 1981. She competed in the women's 100 meters at the 2004 Summer Olympics. She was one among the top 30 participants in women's 60 meters event at the 2002 European Athletics Indoor Championships.

Aleksandra Vojnevska is the president of the Athletic Federation of North Macedonia.

References

1981 births
Living people
Athletes (track and field) at the 2004 Summer Olympics
Macedonian female sprinters
Olympic athletes of North Macedonia
Athletics (track and field) administrators
Women sports executives and administrators
Place of birth missing (living people)
Olympic female sprinters